The  men's 200 metre breaststroke was one of 6 swimming events on the Swimming at the 1908 Summer Olympics programme. It was the only breaststroke event on the schedule.  1908 was the first appearance of the 200 metre breaststroke, as 1904 had seen the introduction of the stroke to Olympic competition with the 440 yard event. Each nation could enter up to 12 swimmers.

Competition format

With a much larger field than in 1904, the 1908 competition expanded to three rounds: heats, semifinals, and a final. The 1908 Games also restored the wild-card system from 1900, allowing the fastest swimmers who did not win their heat to advance. The seven heats consisted of between 3 and 5 swimmers, with the winner of the heat advancing along with the fastest loser from across the heats (all tied swimmers advanced in the case of equal times). There were two semifinals, intended to be of 5 swimmers each but one of which actually had 6 due to a tie in the heats; the top 2 finishers in each semifinal (regardless of overall time) advanced to the 4-person final.

Each race involved two lengths of the 100 metre pool. The rules required that "both hands of the competitor must be pushed forward and brought backwards simultaneously, the shoulders must be kept perfectly in line with the surface of the water, and when touching at the turn . . . the touch shall be made with both hands" and that "the touch at the finish shall be made with both hands."

Results

First round

The fastest swimmer in each heat and the fastest loser advanced, qualifying 8 swimmers for the semifinals.

Heat 1

Heat 2

Heat 3

Heat 4

Heat 5

Heat 6

Heat 7

Semifinals

The fastest two swimmers from each semifinal advanced to the final.

Semifinal 1

Semifinal 2

Final

References

Sources
 
 

Men's breaststroke 200 metre